Virginia Department of Highways Building, also known as the State Highway Commission Building, is a historic government office building located in Richmond, Virginia.  The building serves as headquarters for the Virginia Department of Transportation.  It was built in 1937, and is a four-story, Stripped Classicism style building.  It is of steel and reinforced concrete construction, with a veneer of limestone, Virginia greenstone, and pink granite.

It was listed on the National Register of Historic Places in 2004.

References

Government buildings on the National Register of Historic Places in Virginia
Neoclassical architecture in Virginia
Government buildings completed in 1937
Buildings and structures in Richmond, Virginia
National Register of Historic Places in Richmond, Virginia
Stripped Classical architecture in the United States